The R821 road is a regional road in south Dublin, Ireland. The road starts at the junction with the R115 (Willbrook Road) in Rathfarnham and passes through Nutgrove before terminating at Churchtown.

Route
 The road starts at the T-junction with the R115 (Willbrook Road) beside the well known The Yellow House pub. The road heads in an easterly direction and is known as Grange Road.
 About 350 metres further the Grange Road turns off in a southerly direction as the R822 while the R821 continues easterly as Nutgrove Avenue.
 The route passes the shopping center and retail park in Nutgrove after a crossroad with local roads.
 The route terminates at a triangle in Churchtown where it connects with the R112 (Upper Churchtown Road) and a local road (Beaumont Avenue).

Transport
A westbound bus lane is present along the entire route while after Nutgrove there is also a bus lane heading east until the end of the route in Churchtown. There are a number of Dublin Bus routes along the R821:
 16
 16A
 17
 75

There is an off street bike lane on the route though there are a few sections where the lane ends unexpectedly.

Future plans
Currently there are plans to upgrade the junction with the R112 and Beaumont Avenue.

See also
Roads in Ireland
National primary road
National secondary road

References

Roads Act 1993 (Classification of Regional Roads) Order 2006 – Department of Transport

Regional roads in the Republic of Ireland
Roads in County Dublin